Nasa Mountain is a  tall mountain that is situated on the border of Sweden and Norway.  It is located near Arjeplog in Arjeplog Municipality in western Norrbotten County in Sweden and near Dunderland in the municipality of Rana in Nordland county, Norway.  There is a marker at the summit of the mountain denoting the border between the two countries.  The mountain is best known for the Nasa silver mine.  The mining area still has a number of old quarries, some ruins, and a cemetery.  There is also a restored miners cottage from 1889 located on the site.

References

Mountains of Norrbotten County
Norway–Sweden border
Rana, Norway
International mountains of Europe
Landforms of Nordland